Salt Harbour is located in Herring Neck, New World Island, Newfoundland and Labrador. Salt Harbour is a one street town that has a church and a community centre.

Populated coastal places in Canada
Populated places in Newfoundland and Labrador